Raşit Öwezgeldiýewiç Meredow (Cyrillic: Рашит Өвезгелдиевич Мередов; born 29 May 1960) is a Turkmen politician and diplomat who has served as Vice President of Turkmenistan since 2007.

Biography 
Raşit Meredow was born in Ashgabat on 29 May 1960. His father Öwezgeldi was a Turkmen scientist and lawyer. His mother is an ethnic Azerbaijani. Meredow's relatives on his mother’s side live in the city of Mary, where she herself spent her childhood before moving to Ashgabat. Meredow’s sister and close relatives live in Mary, with his sister teaching at a local high school.

In 1977, he entered the Moscow State University department of law. In 1982, he began as a teacher in the department of civil law and civil process of the Turkmen State University. In 1984-1987, he studied as a post-graduate student at the Moscow State University. He holds a master's degree in law. In 1987-1990, he was lecturer, senior teacher in the department of civil law and civil process of the Turkmen State University. In 1990-1991, he was chief consultant, head of sector, head of department in the Ministry of Justice of Turkmenistan. Starting in 1991, he worked as head of law enforcing agencies department of the council for coordination of law enforcing agencies under the President of Turkmenistan. Starting in March 1993, he worked as head of the law department in the office of the President of Turkmenistan. Starting in December 1994, he was chairman of the law committee of the Mejlis of Turkmenistan. Starting in 1996, he was deputy director of the Turkmen National Institute of Democracy and Human Rights under the President of Turkmenistan.

In May 1999, he was appointed as First Deputy Minister of Foreign Affairs. In December 1999, he was appointed First Deputy Chairman of the Mejlis of Turkmenistan. In May 2001, he was elected as Chairman of the Mejlis of Turkmenistan. In July 2001, he was appointed as Minister of Foreign Affairs of Turkmenistan. Starting in August 2001, he simultaneously performed duties of director of the Turkmen National Institute of Democracy and Human Rights under the President of Turkmenistan. From 2003 to 2005, he worked as Deputy Chairman of the Cabinet of Ministers of Turkmenistan. He was dismissed in 2005 for “poor performance” of his duties.

He speaks fluent Russian, Turkish and English outside his native Turkmen language.

Awards
 Jubilee Medal "25 years of Turkmenistan's Independence"
"For the love of Fatherland" Medal 
"Gayrat" Medal
"Galkynysh" Order
"Dustlik" Order (Uzbekistan, Order of Friendship)

See also
List of foreign ministers in 2017
List of current foreign ministers

References

External links 
 

Chairmen of the Assembly of Turkmenistan
Members of the Assembly of Turkmenistan
Living people
Government ministers of Turkmenistan
1960 births
People from Ashgabat
Foreign ministers of Turkmenistan
Vice-presidents of Turkmenistan
Moscow State University alumni
Academic staff of Turkmen State University